Brendan Mark Jones (born 3 March 1975) is an Australian professional golfer who plays on the Japan Golf Tour, where he has won 15 times between 2002 and 2019.

Amateur career
Jones has a successful amateur career. He was part of the Australian team that took silver medal in the 1998 Eisenhower Trophy and he won the Australian Amateur in 1999, beating Mahal Pearce 2&1 in the final.

Professional career
Jones turned professional in 1999. He played two tournaments on the 2000 Japan Golf Tour and has played regularly on the tour since 2001.

In 2005, Jones was a member of the PGA Tour. Despite finishing in a tie for second at the B.C. Open, he narrowly failed to win enough money to retain his tour card. He has featured in the top 100 of the Official World Golf Ranking reaching as high as 52 during 2011.

Amateur wins
this list may be incomplete
1995 New South Wales Amateur
1996 New South Wales Medal (tied with Scott Gardiner and Nathan Green)
1997 New South Wales Medal
1998 Riversdale Cup
1999 Australian Amateur, Master of the Amateurs

Professional wins (19)

Japan Golf Tour wins (15)

*Note: The 2010 Asia-Pacific Panasonic Open was shortened to 54 holes due to inclement weather.
1Co-sanctioned by the Asian Tour

Japan Golf Tour playoff record (3–2)

Asian Tour wins (2)

*Note: The 2010 Asia-Pacific Panasonic Open was shortened to 54 holes due to inclement weather.
1Co-sanctioned by the Japan Golf Tour
2Co-sanctioned by the PGA Tour of Australasia

PGA Tour of Australasia wins (1)

1Co-sanctioned by the Asian Tour

PGA Tour of Australasia playoff record (0–1)

Nationwide Tour wins (1)

Nationwide Tour playoff record (0–1)

Other wins (2)
1999 Tasmanian Open
2007 Murrumbidgee Country Club Pro-Am

Results in major championships

CUT = missed the half-way cut
"T" = tied

Results in World Golf Championships

QF, R16, R32, R64 = Round in which player lost in match play
"T" = Tied
Note that the HSBC Champions did not become a WGC event until 2009.

Team appearances
Amateur
Eisenhower Trophy (representing Australia): 1998
Four Nations: 1994, 1995, 1996, 1997, 1998, 1999
Australian Men's Interstate Teams Matches (representing New South Wales): 1993, 1994, 1995 (winners), 1996 (winners), 1997, 1998 (winners)

Professional
World Cup (representing Australia): 2008, 2011

See also
2004 Nationwide Tour graduates
List of golfers with most Japan Golf Tour wins

References

External links

Australian male golfers
PGA Tour of Australasia golfers
Japan Golf Tour golfers
PGA Tour golfers
Korn Ferry Tour graduates
Sportsmen from New South Wales
People from the Central West (New South Wales)
1975 births
Living people